The Front Ranges are a group of mountain ranges in the Canadian Rockies of eastern British Columbia and western Alberta, Canada. It is lowest and the easternmost of the three main subranges of the Continental Ranges, located east of the Bull and Elk rivers and a fault line extending northwest of West Elk Pass to McGregor Pass.

Subranges
Bare Range
Bighorn Range
Bosche Range
De Smet Range
Elk Range
Fairholme Range
First Range
Fisher Range
Goat Range
Greenhills Range
High Rock Range
Highwood Range
Jacques Range
Kananaskis Range
Lizard Range
Maligne Range
Miette Range
Murchison Group
Nikanassin Range
Opal Range
Palliser Range
Queen Elizabeth Ranges
Ram Range
Sawback Range
Slate Range
Taylor Range
Vermilion Range
Victoria Cross Ranges
Whitegoat Peaks
Wisukitsak Range

References

Ranges of the Canadian Rockies